Campagnac-lès-Quercy (literally Campagnac near Quercy) is a commune in the southern Dordogne department in Nouvelle-Aquitaine in southwestern France. It is located about 30 km south of Sarlat-la-Canéda, close to the border with Lot-et-Garonne.

Population

See also
Communes of the Dordogne department

References

Communes of Dordogne